Akbar Hermawan (born 29 July 1998) is an Indonesian professional footballer who plays as a midfielder for Liga 2 club Persela Lamongan.

Club career

Persela Lamongan
He was signed for Persela Lamongan to play in Liga 1 in the 2021 season. Akbar made his first-team debut on 4 September 2021 in a match against PSIS Semarang at the Wibawa Mukti Stadium, Cikarang.

Career statistics

Club

Notes

References

External links
 Akbar Hermawan at Soccerway
 Akbar Hermawan at Liga Indonesia

1998 births
Living people
Indonesian footballers
Persela Lamongan players
Association football midfielders
Sportspeople from Makassar
21st-century Indonesian people